Vladimir Vladimirovich Abrikosov (22 October 1880 – 22 July 1966) was a Catholic priest of the Byzantine rite who converted from Russian Orthodoxy and a member of Russian apostolate in the diaspora.

Early years

Abrikosov was baptized in the Russian Orthodox Church, but in his youth his attitude towards religion became critical. Abrikosov graduated from the 5th Moscow Gymnasium and historical-philological faculty of Moscow University, and also studied at Oxford. In 1905, he married his cousin Anna Abrikosova. For five years the couple traveled in Europe, where they became seriously interested in Catholicism.

Conversion to Catholicism

In 1908, Anna Abrikosova converted to Catholicism, and a year later Vladimir converted as well. In 1910, Abrikosov returned to Russia. In his apartment in Moscow, they organized meetings of intellectuals, speaking to them on religious subjects and material support for poor Catholic children. Abrikosov's apartment was at that time one of the main centers for the dissemination of Catholic ideas in Moscow. In 1913, the couple were accepted into the novitiate of the Third Order of the Dominicans. In the same year, during a trip to Rome, they took vows to become members of the Order and had an audience with Pope Pius X. In Russia Abrikosov practised in the Latin rite, intending to revert to the Byzantine rite when it had developed sufficiently in Russia.

Ordination as a Catholic priest

On 29 May 1917, Vladimir Abrikosov took part in the Council of the Russian Greek Catholic Church and was ordained a Catholic priest of the Byzantine rite by Metropolitan Andrey Sheptytsky of the Ukrainian Greek-Catholic Church. In the same year Sheptytsky appointed him rector of the Moscow Greek Catholic parish and head of the Moscow Dominicans.

Arrest and expulsion from Russia

In 1920–1922 in the Abrikosovs' house dialogue took place between representatives of the Catholic and Orthodox churches, which was attended by Moscow intellectuals. Under the influence of Abrikosov in particular, Dmitriy Kuz'min-Karavaev converted to Catholicism. Such activity was considered counterrevolutionary and on 17 August 1922, Vladimir Abrikosov was arrested and sentenced to death, but the punishment was subsequently commuted to perpetual exile. On 29 September of the same year, Abrikosov was expelled from Russia by philosophers' ship, together with the 150 of the most prominent Russian intellectuals.

Exile

Abrikosov built up contacts with various representatives of the Russian emigre community, organized in Rome a Committee of Russian Catholics, and kept the Holy See constantly informed as to the persecution of Catholics in Soviet Russia, among whom was his wife.
 
In 1922 Abrikosov obtained an audience with Pope Pius XI to discuss the situation of the Russian Catholic Church. Soon after, Abrikosov was named Procurator of the Russian Exarchate by Mgr. Jules Tibirghien, an official of the Congregation for Eastern Churches. However, Abrikosov faced accusations of being a Russian spy by a Russian officer, Baron Igor von der Launitz. He also faced strong opposition from Bishop Michel d'Herbigny, who wanted Abrikosov to resign his position as Procurator, and conflicts with the Jesuits. Abrikosov left Rome to establish himself in Paris, when it was rumoured that D'Herbigny intended to abolish the Exarchate.

Death

In the last years of his life, Abrikosov withdrew from contacts with the Russian émigré community and lived in solitude. He died on 22 July 1966.

References

External links
 http://rumkatkilise.org/necplus.htm
 https://web.archive.org/web/20091226165817/http://vselenstvo.narod.ru/library/histdest.htm

1880 births
1966 deaths
Burials at Sainte-Geneviève-des-Bois Russian Cemetery
Converts to Eastern Catholicism from Eastern Orthodoxy
Emigrants from the Russian Empire to Italy
Emigrants from the Russian Empire to France
Former Russian Orthodox Christians
Imperial Moscow University alumni
Russian Eastern Catholics
White Russian emigrants to Italy
White Russian emigrants to France